Sima Lang (171–217), courtesy name Boda, was a government official who lived during the late Eastern Han dynasty of China. He was the eldest among the eight sons of Sima Fang, who served as the Intendant of the Capital during the reign of Emperor Ling, He was described as a big and tall man (approximately 1.91 metres). In his early years, he took the tests required to serve as an official in the Han government and briefly held the position of a civil service cadet. In 189, when the warlord Dong Zhuo seized control of the Han central government, Sima Lang managed to escape with his family and return to his hometown.

Later in 202, Sima Lang reentered government service and served in the central government, then under the control of the warlord Cao Cao. In his early career, Cao Cao served as a district security chief in the imperial capital Luoyang after Sima Lang's father Sima Fang, then the Intendant of the Capital, recommended him for the job. Now that Cao Cao had become the de facto head of the central government, he wanted to repay Sima Fang's favour by treating Sima Lang well. Over the subsequent years, he appointed Sima Lang to various positions as either a county prefect or county chief. When he held office, Sima Lang adopted policies which benefited the common people, and thus earned their respect in return.

In 208, after he assumed office as Imperial Chancellor, Cao Cao recruited Sima Lang to be his Registrar. Some time later, Cao Cao appointed Sima Lang as the Inspector of Yan Province. Sima Lang performed well in office and gained much respect from the people in Yan Province. Despite his accomplishments, however, he never ceased to praise his younger brother, Sima Yi. He went so far as to say, "I don't even come close to matching his abilities."

In the year 217, Sima Lang accompanied Cao Cao's generals Xiahou Dun and Zang Ba on a military campaign against a rival warlord, Sun Quan. During the campaign, an epidemic broke out in the army and many soldiers fell sick. While distributing medicine to the soldiers, Sima Lang caught the disease himself and became ill too. He eventually succumbed to his illness and died.

Sima Lang had a son, Sima Yi (司馬遺; note the different Chinese character for Yi from the one in Sima Yi's name), who died prematurely so he had no heir. However, some time later, Sima Wang, one of Sima Lang's nephews, was transferred to Sima Lang's lineage (i.e. "adopted" as Sima Lang's son) to continue Sima Lang's family line.

See also
 Lists of people of the Three Kingdoms

Notes

References

 Chen, Shou (3rd century). Records of the Three Kingdoms (Sanguozhi).
 Pei, Songzhi (5th century). Annotations to Records of the Three Kingdoms (Sanguozhi zhu).

171 births
217 deaths
Officials under Cao Cao
Politicians from Jiaozuo
Han dynasty politicians from Henan